G. D. Memorial College of Pharmacy is a part of the Lucky Shikshan Sansthan, an educational society in Jodhpur.

The college is affiliated with Rajasthan University of Health Sciences, Jaipur, and is recognized by the Pharmacy Council of India and the All India Council for Technical Education. It currently offers masters courses in pharmacology for 18 students at a time and bachelor's courses for 60.

The college is governed by the G.D. Memorial Group of Institutions, a part of LSS.

External links 
 GD Memorial College of Pharmacy

Pharmacy schools in India
Universities and colleges in Jodhpur
Educational institutions in India with year of establishment missing